Cryptandra scoparia is a species of flowering plant in the family Rhamnaceae and is endemic to the southwest of Western Australia. It was first formally described in 1848 by Siegfried Reissek in Plantae Preissianae. The specific epithet (scoparia) means "sweeper", hence "broom-like".

This cryptandra grows in sandy soil over laterite in the Avon Wheatbelt, Geraldton Sandplains, Jarrah Forest and Swan Coastal Plain bioregions of south-western Western Australia.

References

scoparia
Rosales of Australia
Flora of Western Australia
Plants described in 1848